The Best of The Waterboys 81–90 is a compilation album by The Waterboys, released 29 April 1991.

Background
The Best of The Waterboys 81–90 is made up of 12 tracks which were personally selected by Mike Scott. The album, along with a re-issue of the single "The Whole of the Moon", was an attempt by Chrysalis Records to boost the band's record sales to match their reputation. A survey of album buyers carried out by the label found that 11% considered themselves fans of the Waterboys and only 1% actually owned any of their singles or albums. The re-release of "The Whole of the Moon" preceded the album and reached No. 3 in the UK Singles Chart. From 22 April, a week before the compilation's release, Chrysalis launched a £100,000 marketing campaign which included press advertising and in-store displays, and this was followed by a £150,000 TV advertising campaign.

Jason Guy, the head of marketing at Chrysalis, told Music Week in 1991, "The band have a great reputation and they've released five albums, but people don't know where to start. This compilation solves that problem." The compilation's booklet was provided with images of the band's studio albums along with their track listings to encourage buyers to seek out the band's back catalogue based on the tracks they liked on the compilation. The album was released on 29 April and reached No. 2 in the UK Albums Chart. It was also a success in Europe, reaching No. 11 on the European Top 100 Albums chart.

Speaking of the compilation to Melody Maker in 1991, Scott stated,

Critical reception
Upon its release, Ian Gittins of Melody Maker described the compilation as "unreservedly recommended" and a "splendid document, a treasure trove which tacitly acknowledges that Mike Scott's aesthetic fortunes have taken a recent dip". He favoured the material from the Waterboys' earlier "Big Music" period, commenting, "Few bands have soared like the Waterboys. So very few have found it in them to make music gripped by such a huge, hurting sense of ambition, so devout a quest for the stars, so passionate a bid to transcend history and genre via mighty spirit. Few have seen so much of the moon. And few star-seekers, it must sadly be said, have plunged back to the mud of terra firma with such a sickening thud. The Waterboys had it all."

Track listing

Charts

References

The Waterboys albums
1991 compilation albums
Chrysalis Records compilation albums